Larry Michael White is an American country music artist. The son of songwriter L. E. White, who has written for Conway Twitty, Michael had a song he wrote recorded when he was still a teenager. "You Make It Hard To Take The Easy Way Out" appeared on the B-side to Conway Twitty's hit "You've Never Been This Far Before".

Michael was later signed to Reprise Records in 1992, releasing his debut album Familiar Ground that year. This album produced three chart singles for him on the Billboard Hot Country Singles & Tracks (now Hot Country Songs) charts, including the No. 32 "Professional Fool." The album was produced by Robert Byrne.

White also was a writer on "Rock-a-Bye Heart" for Dana McVicker, "Fighting Fire with Fire" for Davis Daniel, "Loving Every Minute" for Mark Wills, "The Baby" for Blake Shelton, and "Kiss You in the Morning" by Michael Ray, the latter two of which reached No. 1 on the country singles charts. "Loving Every Minute" and "The Baby" both earned White ASCAP awards for being among the most performed country songs of the year, in 2002 and 2003 respectively.

Discography

Albums

Singles

Music videos

References

American country singer-songwriters
Living people
People from Knoxville, Tennessee
Singer-songwriters from Tennessee
Reprise Records artists
Country musicians from Tennessee
Year of birth missing (living people)